XO-6b is a transiting exoplanet, a hot Jupiter, orbiting the star XO-6 around 760 Light Years (230 Parsecs) away from Earth. It was discovered in 2016 by the XO planet search team.

Physical properties 
XO-6b is one of the puffiest planets ever discovered, with a maximum mass of 4.4 times of Jupiter. It is up to twice as wide, making it one of the largest exoplanets ever found (see list of largest exoplanets). Later estimates, however, make it around two times the mass of Jupiter.

XO-6b has a tight orbit, which means a year on it is only about 4 days. XO-6 is slightly more than one tenth as far from its host star as Mercury is to the sun.

XO-6
XO-6b orbits XO-6, a faint 10th magnitude star in the constellation Camelopardalis. Due to its magnitude, this star is too faint to be seen with the naked eye, but can be seen with a telescope. XO-6  is a F-type main-sequence star with about 1.5 times the mass of the Sun. It is also radiating 4 times as bright, and is almost twice the size of the Sun. It is also hotter, with a temperature of 6720 kelvins, which gives it the typical hue of an F-type star. Unlike most other stars of its kind, XO-6 rotates rapidly at a rate of 43 km/s.

References

Further reading

Exoplanets discovered in 2016
Transiting exoplanets
Hot Jupiters
Camelopardalis (constellation)